The pont de Tolbiac is a bridge across the Seine in Paris built between 1879 and 1882 by H.P. Bernard, and J.D.A. Pérouse.  It crosses from the 12th to the 13th arrondissement, linking quai de Bercy to rue Neuve Tolbiac.  Its nearest Paris Metro station is Cour Saint-Émilion.

History

The pont de Tolbiac was built in a wave of urbanisation of eastern Paris in the second half of the 19th century.  The decision to build it was made in 1877 by a vote of the municipal council, in order to create an intermediate crossing in the long space between the existing Pont National and Pont de Bercy. The city financed the works, which began in 1879.  It was hit by a downed British plane in 1943.
In the 1990s it became the location for techno raves.

Architecture

See also
 List of crossings of the River Seine

References

External links

  Mairie de Paris
  Structurae

Tolbiac
Tolbiac
Buildings and structures in the 12th arrondissement of Paris
Buildings and structures in the 13th arrondissement of Paris